In mathematics, the Frobenius inner product is a binary operation that takes two matrices and returns a scalar. It is often denoted . The operation is a component-wise inner product of two matrices as though they are vectors, and satisfies the axioms for an inner product. The two matrices must have the same dimension - same number of rows and columns, but are not restricted to be square matrices.

Definition

Given two complex number-valued n×m matrices A and B, written explicitly as

the Frobenius inner product is defined as,

where the overline denotes the complex conjugate, and  denotes Hermitian conjugate. Explicitly this sum is

The calculation is very similar to the dot product, which in turn is an example of an inner product.

Relation to other products

If A and B are each real-valued matrices, the Frobenius inner product is the sum of the entries of the Hadamard product. If the matrices are vectorised (i.e., converted into column vectors, denoted by ""), then

Therefore

Properties

It is a sesquilinear form, for four complex-valued matrices A, B, C, D, and two complex numbers a and b:

Also, exchanging the matrices amounts to complex conjugation:

For the same matrix,

,
and,
.

Frobenius norm 
The inner product induces the Frobenius norm

Examples

Real-valued matrices

For two real-valued matrices, if

then

Complex-valued matrices

For two complex-valued matrices, if

then 

while

The Frobenius inner products of A with itself, and B with itself, are respectively

See also

Hadamard product (matrices)
Hilbert–Schmidt inner product
Kronecker product
Matrix analysis
Matrix multiplication
Matrix norm
Tensor product of Hilbert spaces – the Frobenius inner product is the special case where the vector spaces are finite-dimensional real or complex vector spaces with the usual Euclidean inner product

References 

Matrix theory
Bilinear maps
Multiplication
Numerical linear algebra